Shakhboz Kholmurzaev (born February 26, 1996) is an Uzbekistani rower. He placed 22nd in the men's single sculls event at the 2016 Summer Olympics.

References

World Rowing profile

1996 births
Living people
Uzbekistani male rowers
Olympic rowers of Uzbekistan
Rowers at the 2016 Summer Olympics
Rowers at the 2020 Summer Olympics
Rowers at the 2018 Asian Games
Medalists at the 2018 Asian Games
Asian Games medalists in rowing
Asian Games gold medalists for Uzbekistan
21st-century Uzbekistani people